Cédric Le Hénaff (born April 19, 1984 in Brest) is a French former professional football player. He last played for Stade Plabennécois.

He played on the professional level in Ligue 2 for Stade Brestois 29 and Vannes OC.

1984 births
Living people
French footballers
Ligue 2 players
Stade Brestois 29 players
AS Beauvais Oise players
Vannes OC players
Stade Plabennécois players
Association football forwards
Sportspeople from Brest, France
Footballers from Brittany
Brittany international footballers